1258 Sicilia, provisional designation , is a dark background asteroid from the outer regions of the asteroid belt, approximately 44 kilometers in diameter. It was discovered on 8 August 1932, by astronomer Karl Reinmuth at the Heidelberg-Königstuhl State Observatory in southwest Germany. The asteroid was named after the Italian island of Sicily.

Orbit and classification 

Sicilia is a non-family asteroid of the main belt's background population. It orbits the Sun in the outer asteroid belt at a distance of 3.0–3.3 AU once every 5 years and 8 months (2,076 days; semi-major axis of 3.19 AU). Its orbit has an eccentricity of 0.04 and an inclination of 8° with respect to the ecliptic. The body's observation arc begins with its official discovery observation at Heidelberg in 1932.

Physical characteristics 

Sicilia is an assumed carbonaceous C-type asteroid.

Rotation period 

In May 2010, a first rotational lightcurve of Sicilia was obtained from photometric observations by astronomers at the Oakley Southern Sky Observatory in Australia. Lightcurve analysis gave a rotation period of 13.500 hours with a brightness amplitude of 0.19 magnitude.

Diameter and albedo 

According to the surveys carried out by the Japanese Akari satellite, the NEOWISE mission of NASA's Wide-field Infrared Survey Explorer, and the Infrared Astronomical Satellite IRAS, Sicilia measures between 36.83 and 52.529 kilometers in diameter and its surface has an albedo between 0.0369 and 0.07.

The Collaborative Asteroid Lightcurve Link largely agrees with IRAS and derives an albedo of 0.0470 and a diameter of 44.39 kilometers based on an absolute magnitude of 10.7.

Naming 

This minor planet was named after the Italian island of Sicily in the Mediterranean Sea. The official naming citation was mentioned in The Names of the Minor Planets by Paul Herget in 1955.

References

External links 
 Asteroid Lightcurve Database (LCDB), query form (info )
 Dictionary of Minor Planet Names, Google books
 Asteroids and comets rotation curves, CdR – Observatoire de Genève, Raoul Behrend
 Discovery Circumstances: Numbered Minor Planets (1)-(5000) – Minor Planet Center
 
 

001258
Discoveries by Karl Wilhelm Reinmuth
Named minor planets
19320808